The 2014 Internationaux de Tennis de Vendée was a professional tennis tournament played on hard courts. It was the second edition of the tournament which was part of the 2014 ATP Challenger Tour. It took place in Mouilleron-le-Captif, France between 3 and 9 November 2014.

Singles main-draw entrants

Seeds

 1 Rankings are as of October 27, 2014.

Other entrants
The following players received wildcards into the singles main draw:
  Quentin Halys
  Calvin Hemery
  Michaël Llodra
  Johan Sébastien Tatlot

The following player received a special exemption into the singles main draw::
  Florent Serra

The following players received entry from the qualifying draw:
  Victor Baluda
  Grégoire Jacq
  Laurent Rochette
  Alexandre Sidorenko

Champions

Singles

 Pierre-Hugues Herbert def.  Marsel İlhan 6–2, 6-3

Doubles

 Pierre-Hugues Herbert /  Nicolas Mahut def.  Tobias Kamke /  Philipp Marx 6–3, 6-4

External links
Official Website

Internationaux de Tennis de Vendee
Internationaux de Tennis de Vendée